Pretty Boy, Dirty Boy is the second studio album by Colombian singer Maluma, released on 30 October 2015, by Sony Music Latin. Work on the album lasted three years, during which Maluma collaborated with various songwriters and producers. Pretty Boy, Dirty Boy is a concept album meant to showcase the different facets of Maluma; the Pretty Boy side contains romantic balladry and the Dirty Boy consisting of reggaeton-infused seductive songs. Four singles were released from the album, "El Tiki" and "Borró Cassette" which preceded its release and "El Perdedor" and "Sin Contrato" – all of them were successful in countries across Latin America. In order to promote the album, Maluma embarked the Pretty Boy, Dirty Boy World Tour in 2016.

Background and release
Work on Pretty Boy, Dirty Boy began in 2012. In the period since then and the album's release, Maluma recorded approximately 80 songs none of which made it on the final track listing. He acknowledged that he "took time" in order to choose the best material for the album, live up the public expectations, make it sound "modern" and in the essence of his musical style; due to that the release date of the album was postponed. The concept behind Pretty Boy, Dirty Boy was to showcase the singer's dual personality; the "pretty-boy persona" represented by romantic ballads and the "dirty-boy" by reggaeton songs with "seductive" lyrics. During an interview, Maluma explained, "All human beings have a duality. I have a romantic side and a more malicious one. I wanted to show both versions".

The album contains features by various Latin singers – Farruko, Alexis & Fido, Leslie Grace, Cosculluela, El Micha and Arcángel all make feature appearances throughout the album. Musically, the album contains elements of reggaeton, pop and urban music. Nick Murray, writing for Rolling Stone summarized the sound as "simple, warm arrangements filled with fleeting melodies and rich basslines". The album was made available for digital download on 30 October 2015. The same day, all of its songs were made available for streaming on Maluma's Vevo channel. "El Tiki" was released as the album's first single on 31 March 2015.

Reception
Sara Skolnick in a review for the website Remezcla, wrote that Pretty Boy, Dirty Boy "stays safely in pop territory, delivering polished, reggaeton-rooted sounds with some straying surprises". However, she noted that the singer's duality, although evident in the lyrics of the song, was not seen in "the music's aesthetic range", adding that the Dirty Boy side of the album remained unexplored. The album was nominated in the category for favorite album at the 2016 Premios Juventud and won a Lo Nuestro Award for Urban Album of the Year.

For the week ending 5 November 2015, Pretty Boy, Dirty Boy debuted on top of the US Billboard Top Latin Albums, selling 3,000 copies in its first week and becoming Maluma's first number-one album on that chart. It has since spent additional 17 weeks on that chart before falling out.

Promotion

In order to promote the album, Maluma launched the Pretty Boy, Dirty Boy World Tour in 2016, visiting mostly countries of Latin America and the US. In May 2016, concert dates for Spain were scheduled in October, marking the first time the singer would perform in the country.

Track listing

Credits and personnel
Credits adapted from the website AllMusic.

Diego Abaroa – label manager
JY (El De La J) – record producer, producer, composer
Kevin Adg – record producer, producer
Alexis – featured artist
Marlon Eduardo Betancur Arbelaez – composer
Arcángel – featured artist
Johnatan Ballesteros – composer
Edgar Barrera – composer, producer
Marlo Eduardo Betancourt – composer
Andrés Castro – composer, producer
Bryan Snaider Lezcano Chaverra – composer, producer
Cosculluela – featured artist
Jonathan De Jesús Gandarilla – composer
Jonathan De La Cruz – composer
Farruko – featured artist
Fido – featured artist, producer
Jorge Fonseca – A&R
Mike Fuller – mastering, mastering engineer
Julián Gaviria – photography
Chan El Genío – engineer, producer
Leslie Grace – featured artist
Obed Guzmán – mixing
Kevin Mauricio Jiménez – composer, producer
Bruno Linares – composer, producer
Maluma – composer, liner notes
Madmusick – producer
Joel Martinez – composer
Master Chris – mixing
Edgardo Matta – mixing
Guillermo Mazorra – A&R
Juan Diego Medina – composer
Christian Mena – composer
El Micha – featured artist
Luis Felipe Morales – composer
Nicolás Muñoz – art direction, concept, graphic design
Justine Quiles – composer
Rene David Cano Rios – composer
Jonathan Rivera – composer, producer
Gabriel Rodríguez – composer, engineer
Sixto Rodriguez – composer
Carlos E. Reyes Rosado – composer
Santana the Golden Boy – producer
Austín Santos – composer
Miky la Sensa – composer
Michael Sierra – composer
Andres Suarez – assistant photographer
Giancarlos Rivera Tapia – composer, producer
Sharo Torres – composer, producer
Roberto "Tito" Vazquez – mixing engineer
Saga WhiteBlack – producer

Charts

Weekly charts

Year-end charts

Certifications

See also
 List of number-one Billboard Latin Albums from the 2010s

References

2015 albums
Maluma albums
Sony Music Colombia albums
Spanish-language albums
Albums produced by Edgar Barrera